Mugur ("bud") and its diminutive Mugurel are Romanian given names. Notable persons with these names include:

Mugur Bolohan (born 1976), Romanian footballer
Mugur Gușatu (born 1969), Romanian footballer
Mugur Isărescu (born 1949), Romanian economist and politician
Mugurel Buga (born 1977), Romanian footballer
Mugurel Dedu (born 1985), Romanian footballer
Mugurel Dumitru (born 1972), Romanian footballer

Romanian masculine given names